A trilby is a narrow-brimmed hat with an indented crown.

Trilby may also refer to:

Arts, entertainment, and media
 Trilby (novel), an 1894 novel by George du Maurier (See also Svengali for other film adaptations of the novel)
 Trilby (play), a 1895 play based on du Maurier's novel
 Trilby (1914 film), a 1914 silent film based on the play
 Trilby (1912 film), a 1912 silent film based on du Maurier's novel
 Trilby (1915 film), a 1915 silent film based on du Maurier's novel
 Trilby (1923 film), a 1923 silent film based on du Maurier's novel
 Trilby, the main character in the Chzo Mythos series of computer adventure games
 Trilby, or the Fairy of Argyll,, an 1822 novella by Charles Nodier
 Trilby (ballet), an 1870 ballet based on Nodier's novel

People
 William Norman Ewer (1885–1977), nicknamed Trilby, a British journalist
 Trilby Clark (1896–1983), Australian actress
 Trilby Glover, Australian actress
 T. Trilby, pseudonym of Thérèse de Marnyhac (1875–1962), French novelist

Places
 Trilby, Florida, U.S.
 Trilby, West Virginia, U.S.

Other uses
 Trilby Tour, a British amateur golf tournament
 Trilby Yates, New Zealand fashion label that operated from the 1920s to 1950s
 , a United States Navy patrol boat in commission during 1917